List of  mammalian fauna of China

List
A list of archaeologically important quaternary mammalian fauna of Northern China:

Nihewan 泥河湾
Gongwangling 公王岭
Zhoukoudian 周口店
Salawusu/Sjara-osso-gol 萨拉乌素 (Malan Loess 马兰黄土)

Literature
Zhongguo da baike quanshu: Kaoguxue [Big Chinese Encyclopedia, vol.: Archaeology], Beijing: Zhongguo da baike quanshu, 1986

.China
Quaternary Asia
quaternary
Lists of biota of China